This is a list of operational wind farms in Canada with a capacity of at least 100 MW. The name of the wind farm is the name used by the energy company when referring to the farm.

The Centennial Wind Power Facility in Saskatchewan was the first wind farm in Canada to have a capacity of at least 100 MW upon completion in 2006. Since then numerous other wind farms have surpassed the 100 MW threshold, most often through the expansion of existing wind farms. All but two of Canada's provinces or territories are home to at least one wind farm, those without being Nunavut and the Northwest Territories.

Largest wind farms
The 363.5 MW Seigneurie de Beaupré Wind Farms in Quebec has been the largest wind farm by installed capacity in Canada since it was last expanded in October 2015 from 340 MW to 363.5 MW. The previous record-holder was the 350 MW Rivière-du-Moulin Wind Project in Quebec from its opening in December 2014 to September 2015.

By province or territory
Listed below is every wind farm in Canada with at least two wind turbines and a capacity of at least 0.1 MW.

Alberta 

List of wind farms in Alberta.

British Columbia 

List of wind farms in British Columbia.

Manitoba 

List of all wind farms in Manitoba.

Newfoundland and Labrador 

List of wind farms in Newfoundland and Labrador.

New Brunswick 

List of all wind farms in New Brunswick.

Nova Scotia 

List of wind farms in Nova Scotia.

Ontario 

List of all wind farms in Ontario.

Prince Edward Island 

List of all wind farms in Prince Edward Island.

Quebec 

List of wind farms in Quebec.

Saskatchewan 

List of current and planned wind farms in Saskatchewan.

Territories 

The arctic and subarctic climates of northern Canada makes the construction of wind turbines difficult as most are only designed to operate down to a minimum temperature of -30°C (-22°F).

Gallery

See also 

 Electricity sector in Canada
 Wind power in Canada
 List of environment topics
 List of wind farms
 List of wind farms in the United States
 WindShare

Notes and references
Notes

References

External links

 
 Alberta Energy System Operator Current Supply Demand Report
 Canadian Wind Energy Association website
 Canadian wind farms
 Wind Energy Programs of Natural Resources Canada
 List of wind farms source

Wind farms
 
Canada